The University of Kindu (UNIKI) is a public university in the Democratic Republic of the Congo, located in the province of Maniema, city of Kindu. At its creation, it was an Extension of the University of Lubumbashi, then called University Centre of Kindu (C.U.K.). As of 2012, instruction is in French.

History
The university was created 1 October 2004 as Kindu Center University(C.U.K.), extension of the  University of Lubumbashi, and became autonomous in 2010 following Ministerial order No. 157/MINESU/CABMIN/EBK/PK/2010 27 September 2010.

References
 Ministerial Decree No. 157/MINESU/CABMIN/EBK-PK-2010 September 27, 2010, on the empowerment of some extensions of the institutions of higher and university education (article 2 point 8)

See also
 Kindu

Universities in the Democratic Republic of the Congo
Kindu
Educational institutions established in 2004
2004 establishments in the Democratic Republic of the Congo